"They Don't Love You No More" is a song by American record producer DJ Khaled, released as the first single from his eighth studio album I Changed a Lot. The song features guest appearances from American rappers Jay-Z, Meek Mill, Rick Ross and French Montana. The hip hop song's production was handled by OVO Sound's Mike Zombie.

Background 
On April 28, 2014, DJ Khaled announced in an interview with MTV that Jay-Z will be featured on his new single. The interview was noted due to Khaled "cursing, gesturing, and tossing the microphone to the floor in an effort to convey the importance and impact of the music he has coming this summer." Few hours after that, he released the single called "They Don't Love You No More", also featuring frequent collaborators Rick Ross, Meek Mill and French Montana. A remix was released featuring Remy Ma and French Montana on the hook still.

Release 
On April 29, 2014, "They Don't Love You No More" was serviced to mainstream urban radio in the United States. It was then serviced to rhythmic contemporary radio in the US on May 20, 2014.

Music video 
The music video for "They Don't Love You No More" was released on June 22, 2014. It was filmed in several locations in Miami and directed by Gil Green and DJ Khaled. It also featured cameo appearances from Timbaland, Ace Hood, Lil TerRio, Mike Zombie and others. Jay-Z does not physically appear in the video, but his verse still does. Khaled addressed this saying, "You know, Jay-Z really don't shoot that many videos. He aint never say yes and he aint never say no. But if you notice the records he do get on, he don't shoot that many videos. He don't really shoot that many videos for himself. I was grateful to have the verse and the opportunity to work with somebody I'm inspired by and look up to. Just to get him on the record was a major key"

Controversy 
DJ Khaled was delivered a cease and desist letter over the single's cover art shortly after its release by Bigg Bank Entertainment. An independent rapper Kolley released a mixtape, RNS several weeks before DJ Khaled released "They Don't Love You No More". The cover for his mixtape features Kolley biting a gold chain with gold teeth, while Khaled's features him doing the same.

Charts

References

2014 singles
2014 songs
DJ Khaled songs
Jay-Z songs
Meek Mill songs
French Montana songs
Rick Ross songs
Music videos directed by Gil Green
Songs written by Jay-Z
Songs written by DJ Khaled
Songs written by French Montana
Songs written by Rick Ross
Songs written by Meek Mill